Hussey v Palmer [1972] EWCA Civ 1 is an English trusts law case of the Court of Appeal. It concerned the equitable remedy of constructive trusts. It invokes the equitable maxim, "equity regards the substance and not the form."

Facts
A mother, Mrs Hussey, lived on the same property as her daughter at 9 Stanley Road, Wokingham. The mother spent £607 to build an extension to the house of her daughter and son-in-law. After they had a dispute, the mother left the house. The mother claimed that she had an interest in the property, and the daughter argued there was no proprietary right.

Judgment
The Court of Appeal held by majority that a trust was created in favour of the plaintiff. The payment was not intended as a gift, and it would be unconscientious for the money to be retained without a proprietary right arising, in proportion to the money expended.

Lord Denning MR said the following.

Phillimore LJ concurred with Lord Denning MR.

Cairns LJ dissented, and said the following.

See also

English trusts law
Trusts
Court of Equity

References

External links
 Judgment on BAILLI

Lord Denning cases
English property case law
Court of Appeal (England and Wales) cases
1972 in case law
1972 in British law